William Shuford Self (1906–1998) was an American organist and choirmaster.

William Self was born April 22, 1906 in Lenoir, North Carolina. He studied at The Peabody Institute and New England Conservatory, where he received the Diploma (1926) and Soloist Diploma (1930). He also studied with Joseph Bonnet.

Most of Self’s career was spent at two Episcopal Church congregations: All Saints’ Church, Worcester, Massachusetts (1933–1954) and St. Thomas Episcopal Church, New York (1954–1971).

Along with William Bergsma and William Strickland, he judged the 1956 Church of the Ascension's festival anthem composition competition.

William Self died April 8, 1998.

References

Sources
 William Self, For Mine Eyes Have Seen (Worcester, Massachusetts: Worcester Chapter of the American Guild of Organists, 1990)

1906 births
1998 deaths
American classical organists
American male organists
20th-century classical musicians
20th-century American musicians
People from Lenoir, North Carolina
20th-century organists
20th-century American male musicians
Male classical organists